Chris Evert was the reigning singles champion at the Family Circle Cup tennis tournament, and defended her title, defeating Billie Jean King in the final, 6–0, 6–1. The draw consisted of 32 players of which 8 were seeded.

Seeds

Draw

Finals

Top half

Bottom half

References

External links 
 International Tennis Federation (ITF) tournament details

Brisbane International – Singles